The Serbian League season of 1939–40 (Serbian: 1939/40 Српска лига / 1939/40 Srpska liga) was a league which along the Croato-Slovenian one, will form the final group of teams to participate in the 1939–40 Yugoslav Football Championship.  The clubs from the Vardar Banovina, Vrbas Banovina, Zeta Banovina, Morava Banovina Drina Banovina, and Danube Banovina competed in the Serbian League.

BSK Beograd was the league champion.  SK Jugoslavija and FK Slavija will be joined by the top three clubs from the Croato-Slovenian League and will play the final stage of the 1939–40 Yugoslav Football Championship.  SK Zemun will be relegated from the Serbian League.

League

See also
Yugoslav First League
Serbian Football League (1940–1944)

References

External links
 League table at fkvojvodina.com

Serbian Football League (1940–1944) seasons
Serbia
Serbia
Football
Football